Stancheva Peak is an ice-covered peak that forms the west extremity of Bigla Ridge on Foyn Coast, Antarctic Peninsula. It rises to 1644 m and has precipitous rocky northwest, southeast and southwest slopes. It surmounts Sleipnir Glacier to the north and Beaglehole Glacier to the south.

The feature is named after Kameliya Stancheva, participant in the 1996/97 Bulgarian Antarctic campaign, for her support for the Bulgarian Antarctic programme.

Location
British mapping in 1976.

Maps
 British Antarctic Territory.  Scale 1:200000 topographic map. DOS 610 Series, Sheet W 66 64.  Directorate of Overseas Surveys, Tolworth, UK, 1976.
 Antarctic Digital Database (ADD). Scale 1:250000 topographic map of Antarctica. Scientific Committee on Antarctic Research (SCAR). Since 1993, regularly upgraded and updated.

Notes

References
 Stancheva Peak. SCAR Composite Antarctic Gazetteer.
 Bulgarian Antarctic Gazetteer. Antarctic Place-names Commission. (details in Bulgarian, basic data in English)

External links
 Stancheva Peak. Copernix satellite image

Mountains of Graham Land
Foyn Coast
Bulgaria and the Antarctic